This is a list of the three historical regions of Libya by Human Development Index as of 2023 with data for the year 2021.

References 

Libya
Libya
Human Development Index